The Reporters may refer to:

Law reporters, for which see Law report
News journalists, for which see Reporter
 The Reporters (book), a book by John William Wallace
 The Reporters (1988 TV program), a 1980s television program

See also
The Reporter (disambiguation)